The Brittons Academy (formerly Brittons School) is a mixed secondary school located in the Rainham area of the London Borough of Havering, England.

The school first opened in 1952 as a bilateral Technical School for pupils aged 11 to 15. Technical students were transferred to the newly opened Abbs Cross Technical High School  in 1958, and Brittons was redesignated as a coeducational secondary modern school. In 1973 the school was redesignated as a comprehensive school, and by 1981 the school was operating a sixth form for pupils aged up to 18. The sixth form provision was removed in 1990 due to local authority restructuring and Brittons became an 11-16 school. It gained Specialist Technology college status in 2001, and became a Foundation School in 2009.

The Brittons Academy had an Ofsted report of "Inadequate" following a full inspection on 3 July 2019.

References

External links
 The Brittons Academy official website
 

Secondary schools in the London Borough of Havering
Academies in the London Borough of Havering
Educational institutions established in 1952
1952 establishments in England